Erriyon Knighton (born January 29, 2004) is an American sprinter specializing in the 100 meters and 200 meters. At the age of 18, he won the bronze medal in the 200 m at the 2022 World Athletics Championships, becoming the youngest ever individual sprint medalist in Championships history.

Knighton holds the world under-18 best in the 200 m of 19.84 seconds, set on June 27, 2021, and world U20 record with a time of 19.69 seconds, set on June 26, 2022. His best mark of 19.49 s (not ratified) makes him the fifth-fastest athlete in history over the distance, only surpassed by Usain Bolt, Yohan Blake, Noah Lyles and Michael Johnson. It was also the fastest season opener ever.

In 2022, Knighton became the first athlete in history to win a second World Athletics Male Rising Star of the Year award.

Career

Junior career
Erriyon Knighton started participating in track and field in 2019 as a freshman at Hillsborough High School in Tampa, Florida. During his time there, he ran the second fastest time over 200 meters for an under-18 athlete in world history, clocking 20.33 seconds in the final at the 2020 USA Track & Field Junior Olympics in Satellite Beach, Florida. He also played for Hillsborough's football team as a wide receiver; rated a four-star recruit by 247Sports.com, he received scholarship offers from schools including Alabama, Auburn, Florida State, and Florida.

2021
At age 16 in January, Knighton signed a sponsorship deal with Adidas in his junior year of high school, forgoing his remaining two years of amateur competition at Hillsborough High. On May 2, he broke the 10-second barrier over 100 meters at the PURE Athletics Sprint Elite Meet in Clermont, Florida, with a time of 9.99 seconds, but the wind was over the +2.0 meters per second velocity limit (+2.7) for record consideration.

On May 31, the 17-year-old set the world under-18 best in the boys' 200 meters in a time of 20.11 seconds, breaking Usain Bolt's best by two hundredths of a second. At the US Olympic Trials he would improve that time to 20.04 s in the first round on June 25, and then again to 19.88 s in the semi-finals the following day, breaking Bolt's world U20 record by five hundredths of a second. He then improved his own record to 19.84 seconds in the final on June 27, qualifying for the postponed 2020 Tokyo Summer Olympics.

At the Tokyo Games, Knighton became the youngest male to represent the United States in track and field since Jim Ryun in 1964. On August 3, he finished first in his 200-meter Olympic semi-final heat and qualified for an automatic spot in the final to be run the next day. In the final he finished in fourth with a time of 19.93 seconds.

2022
On April 30, Knighton set an unratified world junior record in the 200 m at the LSU Invitational in Baton Rouge running a time of 19.49 seconds. He achieved 19.69 s at the USA Outdoor T&F Championships in June. Knighton later on went on to win the bronze medal in the event at the World Athletics Championships held in Eugene, Oregon with a time of 19.80 s, becoming the youngest ever individual sprint medalist in Championship history. He also became the youngest winner of a Diamond League race with his 200 m victory on September 2 in Brussels.

Achievements
Information from World Athletics profile unless otherwise noted.

Personal bests

Circuit wins
 Diamond League
 2022 (200 m): Brussels Memorial Van Damme

References

External links

2004 births
Living people
African-American male track and field athletes
American male sprinters
Sportspeople from Tampa, Florida
Track and field athletes from Florida
Athletes (track and field) at the 2020 Summer Olympics
Olympic track and field athletes of the United States
21st-century African-American sportspeople